Vladimir Vladimirov (born 21 September 1986) is a Bulgarian football winger who currently plays for Sportist Svoge.

References

1986 births
Living people
First Professional Football League (Bulgaria) players
PFC Vidima-Rakovski Sevlievo players
Bulgarian footballers
Association football wingers